Kadir Talabani (born June 1, 1986) is a Norwegian-Kurdish actor born in Kirkuk, Iraq. After his family got involved in the establishment of the PUK political party in 1975, the Talabanis lived in exile in various locations in the Middle East. Kadir moved to Norway in 1999 with his family.

Kadir started acting in 2009. He finished his bachelor's degree as a part of Det Multinorske program in 2014. He started working at Det Norske Teatret in 2014, and was in three stage productions that year: Elva som deler byen (The river which splits the town) directed by Harry Guttormsen, Hvem er redd (Who is afraid) directed by Lasse Kolsrud, and Andre Verdenskrig (World War II) directed by Erik Ulfsby. He was also cast in the feature film Bare Tjue, directed by Marius Sørvik.

References

'External Links'
Kadir Talabani fanepage 
Kadir Talabani official blogg 
Social Media Coordinator 

1986 births
People from Kirkuk
Iraqi Kurdish people
Kurdish male actors
Norwegian people of Iraqi descent
Norwegian people of Kurdish descent
Norwegian male film actors
Norwegian male stage actors                 
21st-century Norwegian male actors
Iraqi male film actors
Iraqi male stage actors
21st-century Iraqi male actors
Living people